The ancient Egyptian Hill-country or "Foreign land" hieroglyph (𓈉) is a member of the sky, earth, and water hieroglyphs. A form of the hieroglyph in color, has a green line-(banding) at the base of the hieroglyph. The hieroglyph refers to the hills, and mountains, on both sides of the Nile River, and thus the green references the verdant black farming land adjacent to the river proper. It is coded N25 in Gardiner's sign list, and U+13209 in Unicode. It is determinative hieroglyph, simply conveying a meaning, and has no phonetic value.

Various colors, and patterning, may adorn the rest of the hieroglyph when the bottom is green.

Three major uses

The ancient language hilly land hieroglyph has three major uses:

1 – hill country, or hills
2 – a reference to arid, desert land
3 – Determinative, for foreign lands

The language meaning of the hieroglyph is as an ideogram or a determinative in the word khast (khaset), and is often translated as hilly land, desert, foreign land, or district.

Use as determinative

One major use of the hill-country hieroglyph is as the determinative for land, but especially the names of foreign lands. For example in the Merneptah Stele, foreign lands are mentioned, including the name of Hatti.

Partial list with land determinative
List of uses of the foreign land determinative:
 Ashkelon
 Canaan
 Hatti
 Retjenu
 Parthia 𓊪𓃭𓍘𓇋𓍯𓈉, p-rw-t-i-wꜣ
 Kingdom of Kush 𓎡𓄿𓈙𓈉, kꜣš

The Nine bows (foreigners or rebels)

One spelling of the foreign peoples, the Nine bows, is represented by the Hill country hieroglyph, "t", and nine single strokes. The nine foreign lands used for the Nine Bows are also iconographically shown inside of cartouches, with their names. The cartouches are the 'bodies' of the "prisoner", or "captive", arms tied behind the back, the name of the land/city inside the cartouche.

See also

Gardiner's Sign List#N. Sky, Earth, Water
List of Egyptian hieroglyphs

References

Betrò, Maria Carmela.  Hieroglyphics: The Writings of Ancient Egypt, c. 1995, 1996-(English), Abbeville Press Publishers, New York, London, Paris (hardcover)
Budge.  An Egyptian Hieroglyphic Dictionary, E.A.Wallace Budge, (Dover Publications), c 1978, (c 1920), Dover edition, 1978. (In two volumes) (softcover)

Egyptian hieroglyphs: sky-earth-water